Samat may refer to:

Mount Samat, a mountain in the Philippines
Samat, Kyrgyzstan, a village in Batken Region, Kyrgyzstan
Samat, Mudurnu, Turkey
 Samat or Sammat, a common name given to the Samma (tribe)s, a Rajput clan